Mesasigone is a monotypic genus of Asian dwarf spiders containing the single species, Mesasigone mira. It was first described by A. V. Tanasevitch in 1989, and has only been found in China, Iran, Kazakhstan, and Russia.

See also
 List of Linyphiidae species (I–P)

References

Linyphiidae
Monotypic Araneomorphae genera
Spiders of Asia
Spiders of Russia